Universities in Malaysia are ranked in a number of ways, including both national and international ranks.

Overall Summary

International Rankings

Times Higher Education World University Rankings

Times Higher Education World University Rankings by Subjects

Times Higher Education Young University Rankings
Formerly known as Times Higher Education 100 Under 50 University Rankings

Times Higher Education Emerging Economies University Rankings
Formerly known as Times Higher Education BRICS & Emerging Economies University Rankings

Times Higher Education Asia University Rankings

Times Higher Education Asia Pacific University Rankings

Times Higher Education Global University Employability Rankings

Times Higher Education Impact Rankings

Times Higher Education Most International Universities Ranking

QS World University Rankings

QS World University Rankings by Faculty

QS World University Rankings by Subjects

QS Top 50 Under 50 Rankings

QS Asian University Rankings

QS Graduate Employability Rankings

Reuters Top 75: Asia's Most Innovative Universities Rankings

Academic Ranking of World Universities (ARWU)

Academic Ranking of World Universities (ARWU) by Fields

Academic Ranking of World Universities (ARWU) by Special Focus Institution

Academic Ranking of World Universities (ARWU) Global Ranking of Academic Subjects
Formerly known as Academic Ranking of World Universities (ARWU) by Subjects

Nature Index

Centre For World Universities Rankings (CWUR)

NTU Ranking
Also known as Performance Ranking of Scientific Papers For World Universities

US News Best Global Universities Ranking

US News Best Global Universities Rankings By Subjects

RankPro Worldwide Professional University Rankings

UI GreenMetric World University Ranking

Wikipedia Ranking of World Universities (WPRWU)

CWTS Leiden Ranking

University Ranking By Academic Performance (URAP)

Scimago Institutions Ranking

Round University Ranking

Ranking Web of Universities (Webometrics)

Webometrics Transparent Ranking: Top Universities by Google Scholar Citations

WURI Global Top 100 Innovative Universities Rankings

Webometrics Transparent Ranking: Institutional Repositories by Google Scholar

National Rankings

MQA Discipline Based Rating System (D-SETARA)

Notes

References

Universities
University and college rankings
Universities in Malaysia
Malaysia